Stanley Booth (born January 5, 1942, in Waycross, Georgia) is a Memphis, Tennessee-based American music journalist. Characterized by Richie Unterberger as a "fine, if not extremely prolific, writer who generally speaking specializes in portraits of roots musicians, most of whom did their best work in the '60s and '50s," Booth has written extensively about Keith Richards, Otis Redding, Janis Joplin, James Brown, Elvis Presley, Gram Parsons, B.B. King, and Al Green. He chronicled his travels with the Rolling Stones in several of his works.

Career
Booth received a degree in English and art history from Memphis State University (where he cultivated a lifelong friendship with fellow student Jim Dickinson) in 1963. After leaving a graduate program at Tulane University without taking a degree, he began his journalistic career while maintaining a day job with the Tennessee Department of Welfare. His early oeuvre includes notable articles on Memphis musicians like Presley (including a seminal 1967 article for Esquire regarded by James Calemine as "the first serious article" written about the singer) and Redding, the latter of whom Booth witnessed writing the famous song "(Sittin' On) The Dock of the Bay" with Steve Cropper at Stax Studios on the Friday before Redding's death.

After befriending Richards at the instigation of Ian Stewart while covering the trial of Brian Jones in 1968, he ensconced himself in the band's inner circle; shortly thereafter, he traveled with the band during their 1969 American tour. During this period, Booth was introduced to fellow Richards confederate and Waycross native Gram Parsons of The Flying Burrito Brothers (he reviewed The Gilded Palace of Sin for Rolling Stone contemporaneously) and was present at the infamous Altamont Music Festival, where a concertgoer was killed by a member of the Hells' Angels.

Although his 1970 profile of Furry Lewis received the annual Playboy Best Nonfiction Award, Booth retreated to a cabin in the Boston Mountains of Newton County, Arkansas for many years following a 1971 drug conviction of a year's probation. Subsequent setbacks, including circumspection toward the group's 1972 American tour (which he attempted to cover but ultimately castigated as "an ugly scene full of amyl nitrate, Quaaludes, tequila sunrises, cocaine, heroin, and too many pistoleros, and it left me with more material than I could ever use"), precipitated a long creative interregnum typified by "clinical depression, drug problems and domestic upheaval"; these problems were exacerbated by a LSD-induced back injury in 1978. Nevertheless, his long-gestating account of the 1969 tour (Dance with the Devil: The Rolling Stones and Their Times, later republished as The True Adventures of the Rolling Stones) was finally released to rapturous reviews in 1984. However, the book's effusive reception (including plaudits from Richards, who has characterized the book as "the only one I can read and say, 'Yeah, that's how it was...'") belied lingering contractual issues that ensured Booth made "next to nothing" from his work.

In addition to an essay collection (Rythm Oil) and a biography of Richards, Booth has also published articles in Rolling Stone, GQ and many smaller journals. He has also appeared in many documentaries, not only on Southern music and the Rolling Stones, but Tom Thurman's Movies of Color and Peckinpah. For some years Booth lived near Brunswick, Georgia with his late wife, the poet Diann Blakely. He now resides in Memphis, and is finishing the successor to Rythm Oil, currently entitled Blues Dues; a memoir, Tree Full of Owls; and Distant Thoughts, a series of letters chronicling the unfolding literary relationship and love story between Booth and poet Blakely.

Selected works

 "Furry's Blues," 1970 (Playboy article)
 Dance with the Devil: The Rolling Stones and Their Times, 1984
 Rythm Oil: A Journey Through the Music of the American South, 1991
 Keith: Standing in the Shadows, 1996
 The True Adventures of the Rolling Stones, 2000 (revised iteration of Dance with the Devil)

Articles and essays 
 "Blues Dues," by Stanley Booth (Blues For Peace)
 "Sharps and Flats: Various Artists - Midnight in the Garden of Good and Evil: Music From and Inspired by the Motion Picture." Salon. November 21, 1997.
 "Memphis and the Beale Street Blues". Gadfly Online. May 1998.
 "Bobby Rush: A Blues Access Interview". Blues Access. Summer 1998.
 "Crying in the Wilderness". Gadfly. December 1998.
 "Unanointed, Unannealed". Chapter 16. January 20, 2011.
 "Bea Shall Overcome: The Unexpurgated Version". Option. May 18, 2011.

References

External links

 Furry's Blues.- Playboy 17 #4 (1970), p. 100-02, 104, 114, 193-94 (OCRed pdf file 775 KB)
 James Calernine on Booth
 Dwight Garner/Robert Stone, "Save These Books!"/The True Adventures of the Rolling Stones.  Salon. December 4, 1997.
 Diann Blakely, "Getting Respectable." Nashville Scene. March 29, 2001.
 "Mojo Magazine Cover" April 2002, Issue 101, Elvis Issue that included Stanley Booth Article
 Elvis CD Collectors Forum Aug 11, 2013 - Lookin' for Trouble? Mojo Magazine April 2002 Stanley Booth Elvis Article reprint 
 Dave Bry, "Very Recent History: A Dispiriting End To An Earlier Decade." The Awl. December 4, 2009.
 Michael Murray, "'(I Can't Get No) Satisfaction,' 45 Years Later." ABC News. May 6, 2010.
 Reed Johnson, "An Appreciation: Dennis Hopper was a man of his times." Los Angeles Times. June 6, 2010.
 Ethan Russell, "Music, Words & Photography: 'Exiles' in Paris -- Whole Lotta Rolling Stones." Huffington Post. September 24, 2010.
 David L. Ulin, "Book Review: 'Life by Keith Richards." Los Angeles Times. October 28, 2010.
 Zoe Heller, "Mick Without Moss." The New York Times. December 3, 2010.
 Dan Chiasson, "High on the Stones." The New York Review of Books. March 10, 2011.
 Greil Marcus, "Heart of Stone." Los Angeles Review of Books. May 5, 2011.
 "Second Read: Ted Conover on Stanley Booth's The True Adventures of the Rolling Stones". Columbia University Press blog. November 4, 2011.
  Gimme Shelter (1970) - The Criterion Collection
 Biography: The Rolling Stones
 wordIQ.com: The Rolling Stones - Definition
 Richard Williams, "Rock'n'Roll Adventures of the Rolling Stones" The Guardian, April 6, 2012.
 Kevin Perry, "Watch the Stones take Shelter with Stanley Booth!" British GQ.com, April 11, 2012.
 "Get Yer Ya-Ya's Out!" Canongate TV Issue 8, Spring 2012.
 Sean O'Hagan, "Interview"  The Guardian Podcast.  April 4, 2012. 
 Jon Wilson, "Interview" Front Row. April 18, 2012.
 Mick Brown,  "Interview"  The Daily Telegraph. April 19, 2012.
 Andy Wilson, "News"   GQ.com. April 19, 2012
 David Hepworth, "Podcast" The Word. April 27, 2012.
 Davis Inman, "Article"  American Songwriter May 18, 2012.
 Book review: The True Adventures of the Rolling Stones by Stanley Booth. 100% Rock Magazine. September 3, 2012.
 Dorian Lynskey, "Christmas Gifts 2012: The Best Music Books." The Guardian. November 29, 2012.
 Paul Wilner, "Book Review" Stanley Booth’s “Rythm Oil - Music of the American South”  The Journal of Roots Music  NO DEPRESSION  February 22, 2013
 Stanley Booth, "February 1968: A Hound Dog, To The Mansion Born" Esquire Digital Magazine Reprint April 2015

American diarists
American music critics
Writers from Georgia (U.S. state)
University of Memphis alumni
People from Waycross, Georgia
1942 births
Living people